Timothy D. Allman (born 1944) is an American author, historian, and journalist. "In 1968, at age twenty-three, T.D. Allman broke his first big story: the CIA's 'secret war,' against the Communists in Laos. He accomplished this by listening to local people, then trekking over mountains to a clandestine CIA base, Long Cheng. The news in his dispatches spurred congressional investigations and protests in America, and he went on to document the CIA's involvement in the overthrow of Prince Norodom Sihanouk in Cambodia.  He later interviewed Yasser Arafat, Helmut Kohl, Boris Yeltsin, and Manuel Antonio Noriega as foreign correspondent for the magazine Vanity Fair. He has also written two best-selling, prize-winning books on Florida, and what events there reveal about the nature of America. One of his books on foreign policy added the phrase "Rogue State" to foreign policy discourse. He also was the first to popularize the term "secret war" to describe clandestine U.S. involvements in foreign wars.

Author, broadcaster, and investigative analyst John Pilger on Allman and his approach: “The great American journalist T. D. Allman once defined 'genuinely objective journalism' as that which 'not only gets the facts right, it gets the meaning of events right. Objective journalism is compelling not only today. It stands the test of time. It is validated not only by 'reliable sources' but by the unfolding of history. It is reporting that which not only seems right the day it is published. It is journalism that ten, twenty, fifty years after the fact still holds up a true and intelligent mirror to events.”

Life
Allman graduated with honors from Harvard University in 1966.  His first book, Unmanifest Destiny, dealing with issues of American nationalism in U.S. foreign policy, grew out of his doctoral thesis at Oxford University, but his “definitive educational experience” occurred in the lowland town of Nepalganj, Nepal, after joining the Peace Corps in order to avoid the draft. “It's there,” he later wrote, “that I learned the most important thing of all. It is that all humans are truly, totally, completely, indivisibly, equal. What I learned in Nepalganj" he added, "has kept me alive in situations when I might have gotten killed."
“After Nepalganj,” as was later reported in the National Geogaphic magazine, “T.D. Allman exposed the CIA’s secret war in Laos, rescued massacre victims in Cambodia, became an Edward R. Murrow Fellow at the Council on Foreign Relations, survived a kidnapping in Beirut, a bullet in Tiananmen Square, and a balloon crash in Kathmandu while reporting from more than 90 countries.”

Writing
Allman's writing has appeared in The New Yorker, The New York Times, Esquire, The New Republic, Rolling Stone, National Geographic, as well as in The Guardian, Le Monde, The Economist.

His rescued massacre victims in Cambodia, led to his work being banned from The Washington Post. Later, as a contributing editor of Harper's, he aroused further controversy when he predicted that the U.S. defeat in Indochina had opened the door to a new epoch of Pacific Rim success for American values and economic systems. He also rebutted claims that the Earth was running out of oil and predicted that U.S. cities, far from being doomed, were on the verge of a "Yuppie renaissance". His reports from Iraq and on the Colombian drug wars received wide attention, as have his profiles of figures such as Dick Cheney.

Allman's first book on Florida, "Miami: City of the Future" is considered the definitive work in its field. His history of Florida, Finding Florida: The True History of the Sunshine State, was a finalist for the  National Book Award, and named one of the best works of history and non-fiction by Kirkus Reviews. The Florida Association of Authors and Publishers honored it as both the best overall book on Florida, 2013-2014, and the best book in the non-fiction for adults category.

Papers

Harvard University's Houghton Library is the repository of the T.D. Allman archive. The Archives and Special Collections at Amherst College also hold some of his papers.

Legacy
The T.D. Allman Studentships, funded by the ChengZhong Focus Foundation, support ground-breaking independent research into past and present events.

Works

As author
Anatomy of a coup, Glad Day Press, 1970

As co-author or contributor 
 Cambodia: The Widening War in Indochina 
 Reporting Vietnam: American Journalism 1968-1973 
 Conservatism as Heresy: In Defence of Monarchy
 Provence: An Inspired Anthology 
 The Florida Reader: Visions of Paradise 
 Spain: True Stories: The King Who Saved His Country 
  Why Bosnia? 
 Miami, the America Crossroad: A Centennial Journey 
 Busted: Stone Cowboys, Narco-Lords and Washington’s War on Drugs. 
 These United States: Original Essay by Leading American Writers 
 Killed: Great Journalism Too Hot to Print 
 Marguerite Yourcenar and the USA: From Prophecy to Protest

In French
 "Un Destin Ambigu"
 "La Floride : Cœur révélateur des Etats Unis"

In Spanish
 "Miami: La Ciudad del Futuro"
 "El Hombre Mas Peligroso del Mundo"

References

External links
Timothy D. Allman Papers from the Amherst College Archives & Special Collections

1944 births
Living people
Harvard University alumni
Alumni of the University of Oxford
American freelance journalists
Peace Corps volunteers